= San Isidro, Santa Cruz =

Coordinates: 18.0439°S 64.4314°W

San Isidro (Santa Cruz)
- Town
- Interactive map of San Isidro (Santa Cruz)
- Country: Bolivia
- Time zone: UTC-4 (BOT)

San Isidro (Santa Cruz) is a small town in Bolivia.
